Neil Anthony Brisco (born 26 January 1978) is an English former footballer. A versatile player, he was comfortable both in defence and in midfield.

A former Manchester City trainee, he made his name in a six-year spell with Port Vale between 1998 and 2004, lifting the Football League Trophy in 2001. Following this he spent two years at Rochdale, also playing on loan at Northwich Victoria, before entering non-league football permanently in 2006. He then spent brief periods with Scarborough, Barrow, and Mossley. Following a couple of years with Leigh RMI, he retired from the game at Chorley in 2009, so as to concentrate on his work with the prison service.

Career

Manchester City
Brisco started his career as a trainee with Manchester City, though he never made it onto the field for the Maine Road club. At the end of the 1997–98 season City lost their First Division status, though Brisco maintained his by signing with Port Vale.

Port Vale
He made his Port Vale debut in the 1998–99 season, playing 87 minutes of the club's 3–0 defeat to Liverpool in the FA Cup. In 1999–2000 he played fourteen games, though Vale were relegated into the Second Division. He scored his first competitive goal on 10 February 2001, in a 2–1 victory over Bournemouth at Vale Park. Overall, he was restricted to 21 appearances in 2000–01, and so underwent surgery on an ankle injury to try to regain match fitness. Despite this he was still a part of Brian Horton's 2001 Football League Trophy winning first eleven. He became a key first player in the 2001–02 campaign, making 43 appearances in league and cup. He found his first team chances more limited during the 2002–03 season, and played just 24 games as the "Valiants" endured administration. He did though manage to find the net on 15 March, in a 1–1 draw with local rivals Crewe Alexandra at the Alexandra Stadium. He was allowed a move to Stockport County in August 2003, with manager Carlton Palmer wanting a dominant midfielder; however Brisco failed a medical because of a knee injury and the move did not go through. He made thirty appearances in 2003–04, and though manager Martin Foyle was disappointed with his side for failing to reach the play-offs, he still offered Brisco a one-month period in which to mull over a new contract offer. He chose to reject the deal, and so left to join League Two Rochdale.

Rochdale
However, he proved to be unhappy at Spotland, and requested a loan move after a few months. He got his wish in November, as he joined Northwich Victoria of the Conference National. After five games, Rochdale manager Steve Parkin denied "Vics" manager Steve Burr's request to extend the loan into a second month. Brisco quickly returned to the Victoria Stadium though, joining the club on loan in January 2005. The loan ran into February, as Brisco helped the club to climb out of the relegation zone. Regardless of this, following his return to his parent club Northwich were demoted to the Conference North for the 2005–06 season due to ground concerns. Brisco went on to play seventeen games for Rochdale in 2005–06, despite struggling with a knee injury. He was not offered a new contract at the end of the campaign.

Later career
He spent brief periods with Conference North sides Scarborough and Barrow, before heading into Northern Premier League Premier Division with Mossley in November 2006. He spell with Mossley lasted a matter of weeks, and he left after playing just two games. Following a couple of years with Leigh RMI, he joined Chorley in November 2009. After only one Northern Premier League Division One North game for the club he retired from football through injury, so as to concentrate on his work in the prison service.

Style of play
Brisco was a tough-tackling and hard-working midfielder.

Career statistics

Honours
Port Vale
Football League Trophy: 2001

References

1978 births
Living people
English footballers
Association football defenders
Association football midfielders
Manchester City F.C. players
Footballers from Wigan
Port Vale F.C. players
Rochdale A.F.C. players
Northwich Victoria F.C. players
Scarborough F.C. players
Barrow A.F.C. players
Mossley A.F.C. players
Leigh Genesis F.C. players
Chorley F.C. players
English Football League players
National League (English football) players
Northern Premier League players
British prison officers